Sophronica bimaculipennis is a species of beetle in the family Cerambycidae. It was described by Stephan von Breuning in 1955, originally under the genus Sophronisca. It is known from Ghana, the Ivory Coast, and Guinea. It contains the varietas Sophronica bimaculipennis var. besnardi.

References

Sophronica
Beetles described in 1955